Port Penn Historic District is a national historic district located at Port Penn, New Castle County, Delaware.  It encompasses 48 contributing buildings and 5 contributing sites in the original eight block town plan and one block 19th century extension of Port Penn. The earliest building is the Dr. David Stewart House, dated to 1755.  Notable buildings include the Bunlap, or Bendler House (1790s), the Cleaver-Hall
House, Eaton House, Presbyterian Parsonage, T. Cleaver House, S. Carpenter House (bef. 1830), Port Penn School, "Linden Hall" (late 1840s ), Commodore's House, Jackson House (c. 1810), Presbyterian Church, Joseph Cleaver House (c. 1835), and St. Daniel's Methodist Church.

It was listed on the National Register of Historic Places in 1978.

Gallery

References

Historic districts on the National Register of Historic Places in Delaware
Buildings and structures in New Castle County, Delaware
National Register of Historic Places in New Castle County, Delaware